Richard Wayne Allen (born November 7, 1951) is an American politician who has served as the U.S. representative for  since 2015. He is a member of the Republican Party.

Career
Allen attended Auburn University and earned a degree in building construction. He is the founder of R.W. Allen and Associates, a construction company headquartered in Augusta.

U.S. House of Representatives

Elections

Allen ran in the Republican primary for the 12th district against three other candidates. He advanced to the runoff, but lost to State Representative Lee Anderson, 49.7% to 50.3%. Anderson went on to lose the general election to incumbent John Barrow.

Allen ran again in 2014, this time making it to the general election. He defeated Barrow in the November election, a result considered an upset even though the 12th district had been made significantly more Republican by redistricting.

Allen was reelected with 62% of the vote in 2016.

In 2018, after winning the Republican primary with 75.99% of the vote, Allen defeated the Democratic nominee, lawyer and pastor Francys Johnson, with 61% of the vote.

Allen was reelected with 58% of the vote in 2020.

Committee assignments
Committee on Agriculture
Subcommittee on Conservation and Forestry
Subcommittee on General Farm Commodities and Risk Management
Committee on Education and the Workforce
Subcommittee on Higher Education and Workforce Training
Subcommittee on Health, Employment, Labor, and Pensions

Caucuses
 Republican Study Committee

Tenure

LGBT rights
In 2015, Allen cosponsored a resolution to amend the Constitution to ban same-sex marriage. Allen also cosponsored an amendment disagreeing with the Supreme Court ruling in Obergefell v. Hodges, which held that same-sex marriage bans violated the constitution.

During a closed-door Republican meeting about an amendment that prohibited discrimination against LGBT workers, Allen read a Bible verse that says of homosexuals, "they which commit such things are worthy of death." He told the assembled Republicans that they were "going to Hell" if they voted for the amendment.
 
After the 2016 Orlando nightclub shooting, Allen offered prayers to the families of the victims but did not apologize or retract his past comments.

In 2022, Allen voted against H.R.8404 - the Respect for Marriage Act -- which would codify same-sex and interracial marriages.

Texas v. Pennsylvania

In December 2020, Allen was one of 126 Republican members of the House of Representatives to sign an amicus brief in support of Texas v. Pennsylvania, a lawsuit filed at the United States Supreme Court contesting the results of the 2020 presidential election, in which Joe Biden defeated incumbent Donald Trump. The Supreme Court declined to hear the case on the basis that Texas lacked standing under Article III of the Constitution to challenge the results of an election held by another state.

Foreign policy
In 2019, Allen was one of 60 representatives to vote against condemning President Trump's withdrawal from Syria.

In 2020, Allen voted against the National Defense Authorization Act of 2021, which would prevent the president from withdrawing soldiers from Afghanistan without congressional approval.

Personal life
Allen lives in Augusta, Georgia. A Methodist, he is married to Robin Allen and has four children.

See also
List of Auburn University people

References

External links

 Congressman Rick Allen official U.S. House website
 Rick Allen for Congress
 
 
 

|-

1951 births
21st-century American politicians
American construction businesspeople
Auburn University alumni
Living people
Methodists from Georgia (U.S. state)
Politicians from Augusta, Georgia
Republican Party members of the United States House of Representatives from Georgia (U.S. state)
American Methodists